Mely Romero Celis (born 12 September 1977) is a Mexican politician affiliated with the PRI. She currently serves as Senator of the LXII Legislature of the Mexican Congress representing Colima, and previously served in the Congress of Colima.

References

1977 births
Living people
Politicians from Colima
Women members of the Senate of the Republic (Mexico)
Members of the Senate of the Republic (Mexico)
Institutional Revolutionary Party politicians
21st-century Mexican politicians
21st-century Mexican women politicians
University of Colima alumni
Teachers College, Columbia University alumni
Members of the Congress of Colima